Mary McGrory (August 22, 1918 – April 20, 2004) was an American journalist and columnist. She specialized in American politics, and was noted for her detailed coverage of political maneuverings.  She wrote over 8,000 columns, but no books, and made very few media or lecture appearances. She was a fierce opponent of the Vietnam War and was on Richard Nixon's enemies list. One reviewer said:

Career
She was born in Roslindale, Boston, Massachusetts to Edward and Mary McGrory, a tight-knit Irish Catholic family. Her father was a postal clerk and she shared his love of Latin and writing. 
She graduated from the Girls' Latin School and Emmanuel College and began her career as a book reviewer at The Boston Herald.

She was hired in 1947 by The Washington Star and began her career as a journalist, a path she was inspired to take by reading Jane Arden comic strips. 
She rose to prominence as their reporter covering the McCarthy hearings in 1954, portraying McCarthy as a typical neighborhood Irish bully.
McGrory won the Pulitzer Prize for Commentary in 1975, for her articles about the Watergate scandal.

The day after the Star went out of business in 1981, she went to work for The Washington Post.

In 1985, McGrory received the Elijah Parish Lovejoy Award as well as an honorary Doctor of Laws degree from Colby College. 
In 1998, she won the Fourth Estate Award, from the National Press Club.

She died in Washington at the age of 85.

Friendship with the Kennedy Family
McGrory wrote extensively about the Kennedy presidency. She and JFK were close in age, both of Irish descent and from Boston. McGrory's exchange with Daniel Patrick Moynihan after the president's assassination was quoted widely: "We will never laugh again," said McGrory. Moynihan, who worked for President Kennedy responded, "Mary, we will laugh again. But we will never be young again."

McGrory was assigned by the Star to travel with Robert F. Kennedy during his ill-fated 1968 presidential campaign and became close to his wife Ethel at the time.

Urban legend
In a 1983 paperback, Wayne Coffey's 303 of the World's Worst Predictions, McGrory was falsely described as having "predicted" in her Washington Star column that George McGovern would win the 1972 presidential campaign "by a landslide".  As it turned out, the book's author, rather than McGrory, had written ineptly. McGrory's October 22, 1972, Star column had been about McGovern's showing in the state of Michigan, which she felt might be one of the few states McGovern could win. The column began, "Here in Michigan, they have failed to get the word about the Nixon landslide." Nevertheless, readers of Coffey's book were given the impression that the liberal McGrory had made the most erroneous "prediction" in political history.

Awards and honors
1975: Pulitzer Prize for Commentary

1995: The Four Freedoms Award for Freedom of Speech

Works

References

Further reading
 Allen, Henry. "Mary, Mary, Quite Contrary: Mary McGrory would conscript senators to mix drinks for copyboys and media stars to pass hors d'oeuvres," Wall Street Journal Oct. 9, 2015
 , a scholarly biography review; Washington Post review

External links
Columns from the Washington Post

1918 births
2004 deaths
American columnists
American people of Irish descent
Elijah Parish Lovejoy Award recipients
Nixon's Enemies List
Pulitzer Prize for Commentary winners
The Washington Post people
The Washington Star people
Writers from Boston
Recipients of the Four Freedoms Award
American women columnists
People from Roslindale
Boston Latin Academy alumni